Cyrtodactylus hitchi  is a species of gecko, a lizard in the family Gekkonidae. The species is endemic Indonesia.

Etymology
The specific name, hitchi, is in honor of Alan Thomas Hitch.

Geographic range
C. hitchi is found in Southeast Sulawesi province on the island of Sulawesi in Indonesia.

Description
C. hitchi is a small species for its genus. Males are smaller, an example of sexual dimorphism, up to  SVL.

Reproduction
The mode of reproduction of C. hitchi is unknown.

References

Further reading
Mecke S, Hartmann L, Mader F, Kieckbusch M, Kaiser H (2016). "Redescription of Cyrtodactylus fumosus (Müller, 1895) (Reptilia: Squamata: Gekkonidae), with a revised identification key to the bent-toed geckos of Sulawesi". Acta Herpetologica 11 (2): 151–160.
Riyanto A, Kurniati H, Engilis A (2016). "A new Bent-toed gecko (Squamata: Gekkonidae) from the Mekongga Mountains, South East Sulawesi, Indonesia". Zootaxa 4109 (1): 59–72. (Cyrtodactylus hitchi, new species).

Cyrtodactylus
Reptiles described in 2016